Zachary Zorn (born March 10, 1947) is an American former competition swimmer. In 1968 he set a world record in the 100 m freestyle at the Olympic Trials. The same year he won the 100 m NCAA title competing for University of California, Los Angeles. At the 1968 Olympics he earned a gold medal in the 4×100-meter freestyle relay and placed eighth in the individual 100-meter freestyle.

See also
 List of Olympic medalists in swimming (men)
 List of University of California, Los Angeles people
 World record progression 100 metres freestyle
 World record progression 4 × 100 metres freestyle relay

References

1947 births
Living people
American male freestyle swimmers
World record setters in swimming
Olympic gold medalists for the United States in swimming
Sportspeople from Dayton, Ohio
Swimmers at the 1967 Pan American Games
Swimmers at the 1968 Summer Olympics
UCLA Bruins men's swimmers
Medalists at the 1968 Summer Olympics
Pan American Games silver medalists for the United States
Pan American Games medalists in swimming
Universiade medalists in swimming
Universiade gold medalists for the United States
Universiade bronze medalists for the United States
Medalists at the 1967 Summer Universiade
Medalists at the 1967 Pan American Games